Nikiphoros "Nichi" Vlastos (born February 2, 2000) is an American soccer player.

Career

Professional
After playing with the Saint Louis FC academy, Vlastos signed a professional contract with the club's USL Championship side on July 25, 2019. Saint Louis FC folded following the 2020 USL Championship season.

References

External links 
 
 Saint Louis FC profile

2000 births
Living people
American soccer players
Association football midfielders
People from Millstadt, Illinois
Saint Louis FC players
Soccer players from Illinois
Soccer players from Wyoming
Sportspeople from Casper, Wyoming
Sportspeople from Greater St. Louis
USL Championship players